Pol-e Khvab (also Romanized as Pol-e Khvāb and Pol Khvāb) was a village in Adaran Rural District, Asara District, Karaj County, Alborz Province, Iran. At the 2006 census, its population was 237, in 59 families.  Pol-e Khvab is now integrated into the city of Asara.

References 

Former populated places in Karaj County